Typha turcomanica is a plant species native to Republic of Turkmenistan. The species grows in freshwater marshes.

References

turcomanica
Freshwater plants
Flora of Turkmenistan
Plants described in 1949